Rod Snow  is a Canadian former professional rugby union prop.

Snow began his senior club rugby with the Newfoundland amateur club team Dogs RFC.  He went on to play professionally in South Africa for Eastern Province in 1995, before joining Newport RFC in 1996, the club he remained with until the 2002–03 season. However, he made two more appearances as a replacement in 2004 and 2005 making a total number of 190 appearances.  He joined Newport Gwent Dragons for the 2003–04 season.

Snow has earned 62 caps for Canada from May 1995 to September 2007.  He also played for Barbarian F.C. in 1996 against Wales, a match which they lost 10–31.

Snow returned to his home province in 2005, playing for the Newfoundland Rock in their national-championship-winning season, and taking a position as the project manager for the Newfoundland and Labrador Sports Centre, a new development that will upgrade the current Swilers RFC complex into a multi-sport provincial training centre.

Rod accepted an invitation from Canadian coach Rick Suggitt to return to Canada's national team for the 2006 Churchill Cup. Following this tournament, Rod helped his Newfoundland Rock team to a second Rugby Canada Super League Championship in August 2006. The season was not finished, however, as Rod also scored the winning try over the United States Eagles in the Rugby World Cup Qualifying match played in his home town of St. John's, Newfoundland and Labrador, Canada.

In 2012 he retired from all levels of rugby. Snow was named an inaugural inductees for Rugby Canada's Hall of Fame and was inducted into the Newport Rugby Hall of Fame. Additional honours include being Named third-best prop in the world by World Rugby Magazine in 1999, British Writers' Player of the Year in 2005, and the Sports Newfoundland and Labrador's senior male athlete of the year in 1995.

References

External links
Newport Gwent Dragons profile
Newport RFC official site 'History of Newport', 'International players', Snow profile page

Living people
Canadian rugby union players
Barbarian F.C. players
Rugby union props
Newport RFC players
Dragons RFC players
Canada international rugby union players
Year of birth missing (living people)